Bancroft Gherardi Jr. (April 6, 1873 – August 14, 1941) was a noted American electrical engineer, known for his pioneering work in developing the early telephone systems in the United States. Recognized as one of the foremost authorities in telephone engineering, Gherardi was instrumental in developing the transcontinental telephone service in 1915 and the trans-Atlantic radio telephone service in 1927. He was awarded the IEEE Edison Medal in 1932 for "contributions to the art of telephone engineering and the development of electrical communication".

Education and service
Gherardi was born in San Francisco on April 6, 1873, son of Bancroft and Anna Talbot (Rockwell) Gherardi. Gherardi received his B.S. in Electrical Engineering from the Polytechnic Institute of Brooklyn in 1891, and his M.E. and M.M.E degrees from Cornell University in 1893 and 1894, respectively. He received an honorary D. Eng. degree from the Polytechnic Institute of Brooklyn in 1933.

Work
Gherardi is widely recognized as one of the foremost authorities on early telephone engineering for his role in several landmark projects such as the transcontinental telephone service in 1915 and the trans-Atlantic radio telephone service in 1927. He also personally supervised the construction of a "loaded" cable between New York City and Newark, New Jersey, the first such application based on the invention of Michael I. Pupin that improved the transmission on telephone circuits.

Gherardi was a fellow of the American Institute of Electrical Engineers, and served as its president from 1927 to 1928. He was a member of the United Engineering Society, American Society of Mechanical Engineers, American Standards Association, New York Electrical Society, and the Franklin Institute. He was also inducted into the  National Academy of Sciences, and served as the president of the Polytechnic Institute of Brooklyn's alumni association.

References

External links
National Academy of Sciences Biographical Memoir

1873 births
1941 deaths
Cornell University College of Engineering alumni
American electrical engineers
American people of Corsican descent
Members of the United States National Academy of Sciences
Polytechnic Institute of New York University alumni
19th-century American engineers
20th-century American engineers
Engineers from California
People from San Francisco
IEEE Edison Medal recipients